The following is a list of tribes of Kurdish people, an Iranic ethnic group from the geo-cultural region of Kurdistan in Western Asia.

Armenia and Georgia
Kurdish tribes in Armenia and Georgia consist of Yazidis who arrived in Caucasus from the regions of Van, Kars and Dogubayazit during two main waves of migrations, the first wave taking place during the Russo-Ottoman wars of 19th century (1828-1829 and 1879-1882) and the second wave taking place during World War 1, especially during and after the Armenian genocide where Yazidis were also targeted alongside Armenians. Before migrating, Yazidis formed an integral part of Kurdish tribal interactions during the Ottoman empire. The Yazidis of Armenia who arrived during the first wave of migrations, settled in Aparan and Talin provinces in the mountainous regions of Aragatz, whereas the Yazidis who arrived during the second wave settled in villages across Ashtarak, Echmiadzin and Armavir.

The present tribes and tribal confederations with their sub-tribes are listed below:

 Xaltî 
 Anqosî
 Axlerî

Zuqiriya Confederation

 Baravî 
 Bûtikî
 Belekerî
 Dasinî 
 Divinî 
 Korkitiya 
 Kurtikî 
 Masekî
 Chokhreshî
 Memreshî
 Mendesorî
 Mendikî
 Reshî
 Reshkî
 Shemsika
 Sorî

Mehemdiya Confederation

 Mehemdî
 Memresha

Hesiniya Confederation

 Belekerî
 Beyandûrî
 Bûvkî
 Dasinî
 Dawidî
 Divinî
 Dodkî
 Gêloyî 
 Kashakhî
 Mamtajî
 Memîdokî
 Mekhsûdî
 Mûskî
 Mîrangî
 Qazanî
 Qûchî
 Remoshî
 Sherqî
 Tûzhkî
 Ûdî
 Ortilî (Disputed)

Sipki Confederation

 Belî
 Chîlî
 Îsedizî
 Kashakha
 Karêyî
 Kilêrî
 Mikhayla
 Pîvazî
 Rejevî
 Rojkî
 Sahaniya
 Stûrkî
 Shanezera
 Shemsika
 Utî

Azerbaijan
A large portion of the centuries-old Kurdish population in present-day Azerbaijan was deported by the Soviet Union to Central Asia from the 1930s onwards. The remaining Kurdish population in the former Red Kurdistan area (Lachin and Kelbajar districts) was displaced by ethnic-Armenian forces during the first Nagorno-Karabakh War, whilst the Kurds outside of the conflict zone in Azerbaijan became heavily assimilated into Azerbaijani culture.

The information on the tribes in Azerbaijan is from 1936:

Iraq

Baghdad Governorate
The following tribes are present in Baghdad Governorate:
Feyli tribe

Diyala Governorate
The following tribes are present in Diyala Governorate:
Bajalan tribe
Biban tribe
Dilo tribe
Feyli tribe
Hamawand tribe
Jaff tribe
Kaganlu tribe
Kaka'i tribe (Yarsanism)
Kakevar tribe
Kalhor tribe
Leylani tribe
Mamhajan tribe
Palani tribe
Qarah Alush tribe
Suramiri
Şêxbizin tribe
Tilishani tribe
Umarmil tribe 
Zargush tribe
Zand tribe
Zangana tribe

Dohuk Governorate
The following tribes are present in Dohuk Governorate:
Babiri tribe
Bamernî tribe
Barzani tribe
Basidkî tribe (Yezidi)
Berwari tribe
Belesinî tribe (Yezidi)
Birîmenî tribe (Yezidi)
Dina tribe (Yezidi)
Dinnadi tribe (Yezidi)
Kochar tribe
Dolamarî tribe
Doski tribe
Dumilî tribe (Yezidi)
Ertuşi tribe
Guli tribe
Hewêrî tribe (Yezidi)
Hekarî tribe (Yezidi)
Heraqî tribe (Yezidi)
Mamûsî tribe (Yezidi)
Mamesh tribe
Misûsan tribe (Yezidi)
Mizûrî tribe
Nerwa tribe
Pêdayî tribe (Yezidi)
Qaîdî tribe (Yezidi)
Qirnayî tribe (Yezidi)
Rêkanî tribe
Rûbanistî tribe (Yezidi)
Sharafani tribe
Sindî tribe
Sipna tribe
Silêvanî tribe
Sûrçî tribe
Tirk tribe (Yezidi)
Tovi/Tuvi/Toviye tribe
Xaltî tribe (Yezidi)
Xetarî tribe (Yezidi)
Zêbarî tribe

Erbil Governorate
The following tribes are present in Erbil Governorate:
Balak tribe
Ako tribe
Barzani tribe
Barzinji tribe 
Bilbas tribe
Bradost tribe
Dizayee tribe
Dolamari tribe
Gerdi
Haruti tribe
Herki tribe
Kawani tribe
Khailani tribe
Khoshnaw tribe
Mantik tribe
Nanakali tribe
Shwan tribe
Siani tribe
Siyan tribe
Surchi tribe
Zarari tribe
Zebari tribe

Halabja Governorate
Jaff tribe

Kirkuk Governorate
The following tribes are present in Kirkuk Governorate:
Amarmel tribe
Barzinji tribe
Biban tribe
Dilo tribe
Hamawand tribe
Jibari tribe
Kaka'i tribe (Yarsanism)
Salehi tribe
Siyan tribe
Sharafbayani tribe
Shuhan tribe
Talabani tribe
Zangana tribe

Nineveh Governorate
The following tribes and confederations are present in Nineveh Governorate:

Xorkan Tribal Confederation (Yezidi)

Aldexî tribe
Adiyan tribe 
Aldîn tribe 
Bekran tribe
Cefrî tribe
Çêlkan tribe
Dilkan tribe
Heskan tribe
Hewîrî tribe
Helîqî tribe
Kurkurka tribe
Mendikan tribe
Mûsanî tribe
Mehirkan tribe
Musqora tribe
Mala Bakê tribe
Qîçkan tribe
Qîranî tribe
Reshkan tribe
Simûqî tribe
Sherqiyan tribe
Shehwanî tribe

Cuwana Tribal Confederation (Yezidi)

Aqosî tribe
Bekira tribe
Çûkan tribe
Dilkan tribe
Emeran tribe
Hebaban/Hebabat tribe
Howêrî tribe 
Hilêqî tribe
Heskan tribe
Kizan tribe 
Korkorkî tribe
Mashekî tribe 
Mihirkan tribe
Xinan tribe
Mala Xalitê tribe
Miskora tribe
Qîçikan tribe 
Hesenî tribe 
Nukrî tribe
Eldinan tribe 
Usivan tribe
Xosî tribe
Elî Sorka tribe
Xifshan tribe

Other

Bajalan tribe
Duchi tribe
Fuqarah tribe (Yezidi)
Gergeri tribe
Hasenan tribe
Kaka'i tribe (Yarsanism)
Kiran tribe

Saladin Governorate
The following tribes are present in Saladin Governorate:
Kaka'i tribe (Yarsanism)

Sulaymaniyah Governorate
The following tribes are present in Sulaymaniyah Governorate:
Ardalan tribe
Bajalan tribe
Barzinji tribe
Chegini tribe
Guran tribe
Hamawand tribe
Jaff tribe
Jibari tribe
Kalhor tribe
Mangur tribe
Shwan tribe
Zangana tribe

Wasit Governorate
The following tribes are present in Wasit Governorate:
Feyli tribe

Iran

Ardabil Province
The following tribes are present in Ardabil Province:
Delikan tribe
Qolugjan tribe
Shatran tribe

East Azerbaijan Province
The following tribes are present in East Azerbaijan Province:
Chalabianlu tribe
Mohammad Khanlu tribe
Shaqaqi tribe

Fars Province
The following tribes are present in Fars Province:
Chegini tribe
Kordshuli tribe
Kuruni tribe
Lashani tribe
Uriad tribe
Zangana tribe

Gilan Province
The following tribes are present in Gilan Province:
Amar tribe
Reşwan tribe

Hamadan Province
The following tribes are present in Hamadan Province:
Chahardoli tribe
Falak al-Din tribe
Ghiasvand tribe
Jalilvand tribe
Kakavand tribe
Musavand tribe
Torkashvand tribe
Zand tribe
Zola tribe

Ilam Province
The following tribes are present in Ilam Province:
Arkavazi tribe
Badreh tribe
Balavand/Zardalan tribe
Beyrey/Ali Sherwan tribe
Dehbalai tribe
Dilfan tribe
Eyvan tribe
Feyli tribe
Kalhor tribe
Khezel tribe
Kolivand tribe
Malekshahi tribe
Rizehvand tribe
Shuhan tribe

Kermanshah Province
The following tribes are present in Kermanshah Province:
Ahmedvand tribe
Bajalan tribe
Bajulvand tribe
Balvand tribe
Dinarvand tribe
Ghiasvand tribe
Guran tribe
Hulilan tribe
Jaff tribe
Jalilvand tribe
Kakavand tribe
Kalhor tribe
Karam Alivand tribe
Kerindi tribe
Khalvand tribe
Kolya'i tribe
Kuruni tribe
Mafivand tribe
Namivand tribe
Nanakuli tribe
Osmanvand tribe
Payirvand tribe
Qalavand tribe
Sanjâbi tribe
Shabankara tribe
Sharafbayani tribe
Torkashvand tribe
Zangana tribe
Zola tribe

Khorasan Provinces
The following tribes are present in North Khorasan Province and Razavi Khorasan Province:
Amar tribe
Baçvan tribe
Badlan tribe
Berivan tribe
Bicervan tribe
Çapeş tribe
Davan tribe
Hamazkan tribe
Izan tribe
Keyvan tribe
Mamyan tribe
Mastyan tribe
Mozdegan tribe
Palokan tribe
Qaçkan tribe
Qarabas tribe
Qaraçur tribe
Qaraman tribe
Reşwan tribe
Rudkan tribe
Sevkan tribe
Silsepuran tribe
Şadiyan tribe
Şeyhkan tribe
Şirvan tribe
Torosan tribe
Tukan tribe
Zafaran tribe
Zangalan tribe
Zaraqkan tribe
Zardkan tribe
Zeydan tribe

Kurdistan Province
The following tribes are present in Kurdistan Province:
Ardalan tribe
Kabudvand tribe
Khajevand tribe
Jaff tribe
Mukri tribe
Sarshiv tribe
Tilaku'i tribe
Zarrin-Kafsh tribe

Lorestan Province
The following tribes are present in Lorestan Province:
Adinevand tribe
Ahmedvand tribe
Amrayi tribe
Azadbakht tribe
Baharvand tribe
Chegini tribe
Dalvand tribe
Dilfan tribe
Feyli tribe (refugee camp)
Geravand tribe
Ghiasvand tribe
Hasanvand tribe
Itivand tribe
Jalilavand tribe
Jomur tribe
Kakavand tribe
Kolivand tribe
Kushki tribe
Mirvand tribe
Mumiavand tribe
Musavand tribe
Nurali tribe
Padarvand tribe
Romanvand tribe
Shahivand tribe
Tarkhan tribe
Yousefvand tribe

Mazandaran Province
The following tribes are present in Mazandaran Province:
Dilfan tribe
Khajevand tribe
Jahanbeglu tribe
Modan tribe

Qazvin Province
The following tribes are present in Qazvin Province:
Amar tribe
Jalilavand tribe
Reşwan tribe

Tehran Province
The following tribes are present in Tehran Province:
Pazooka tribe

West Azerbaijan Province
The following tribes are present in West Azerbaijan Province:
Bagzâdah tribe
Bradost tribe
Chahardoli tribe
Dehbokri tribe
Donboli tribe
Fayzallahbey tribe
Gewirk tribe
Haydaran tribe
Herki tribe
Jalali tribe
Malkari tribe
Mamash tribe
Mangur tribe
Milan tribe
Mokri tribe
Musilyan tribe
Piran tribe
Shekak tribe
Suseni tribe
Zafaran/Zaxuran tribe
Zerza tribe

Syria

Al-Hasakah and Raqqa Governorates
The following tribes are present in Al-Hasakah Governorate and Raqqa Governorate:
Abajani tribe (Yezidi)
Abasan tribe
Adiya tribe (Yezidi)
Afshi tribe (Yezidi)
Aliyan tribe
Aşitan tribe
Bahcolan tribe (Yezidi)
Berazi tribe
Daqoran tribe
Dasikan tribe (Yezidi)
Dazwani tribe
Dina tribe (Yezidi)
Dorkan tribe
Efshan tribe (Yezidi)
Gabara tribe
Hasenan tribe
Hawna tribe
Heverkan tribe
Jabia tribe
Kafnasa tribe (Yezidi)
Ketikan tribe
Khalta tribe (Yezidi)
Kikan tribe
Kiwakhi tribe (Yezidi)
Koçer tribe
Mahlami tribe
Mahoka tribe (Yezidi)
Marsini tribe
Mihirkan tribe (Yezidi) 
Milan tribe
Miran tribe
Nimrdani tribe (Yezidi)
Omerkan tribe
Omeriyan tribe
Pinar Eliya tribe
Semoqa tribe (Yezidi)
Shifaqta tribe (Yezidi)
Sharqi tribe (Yezidi)
Şêxan tribe
Taqa tribe (Yezidi)

Aleppo Governorate
The following tribes are present in Aleppo Governorate:
Amkan tribe
Berazi tribe
Biyan tribe
Çêlka tribe (Yezidi)
Cûmiyan tribe
Dawudiya tribe (Yezidi)
Dimili tribe
Dinadi tribe (Yezidi)
Heyştiyan tribe
Qopani tribe (Yezidi)
Reşwan tribe
Reşkan tribe (Yezidi)
Rûbariyan tribe
Sheriqan tribe (Yezidi)
Şêxan tribe
Xaltî tribe (Yezidi)
Xastiyan tribe
Xerzan tribe

Turkey

Adıyaman Province
The following tribes are present in Adıyaman Province:
Alikan tribe
Atman tribe
Balyan tribe
Belikan tribe
Bêzikan tribe
Birîmşa tribe
Bîstikan tribe
Canbegan tribe
Cêlikan tribe
Dêrsimî tribe
Dirêjan tribe
Gewozî tribe
Hevêdan tribe
Heyderan tribe
Hûriyan tribe
Izol tribe
Kawan tribe
Kerdizan tribe
Kîkan tribe
Kirvar tribe
Mirdesan tribe
Molikan tribe
Mukriyan tribe
Pîrvan tribe
Reşwan tribe
Şavak tribe
Sinemilli tribe
Sînanka tribe
Şêxbizin tribe
Teşikan tribe
Ziran tribe

Ağrı Province
The following tribes are present in Ağrı Province and are all Shafi'i:
Berjeri tribe
Jalali tribe
Hasenan tribe
Haydaran tribe
Memani tribe
Zilan tribe

Aksaray Province
The following tribes are present in Aksaray Province:
Ekecik/Keşan tribe
Reşwan tribe

Ankara Province
The following tribes are present in Ankara Province:
Atman tribe
Davdan tribe
Canbegan tribe
Bezikan tribe
Biliki tribe
Hecibi tribe
Kîkan tribe
Modan tribe
Reşwan tribe
Sawiki tribe
Şêxan tribe
Şexbizin tribe
Rutan tribe
Têrikan tribe
Zirkan tribe

Ardahan Province
The following tribes are present in Ardahan Province:
Bezikan tribe
Cemaldînî tribe
Kaskan tribe
Sipkan tribe
Pîrebadî tribe
Zîlan tribe

Batman Province
The following tribes are present in Batman Province:
Alikan tribe
Barava/Derhawî tribe
Bekiran tribe
Bozikan tribe
Celali tribe
Daşi tribe
Dermemikan tribe
Etmanekî tribe
Habezbenî tribe
Hesar tribe
Kercoz tribe
Remman tribe
Reşkotan tribe
Seyyid tribe
Sinikan tribe
Timok tribe
Xiyan tribe
Zilan tribe

Bingöl Province
The following tribes are present in Bingöl Province:
Abdalan tribe
Axmur tribe
Az tribe
Began tribe
Bekiran tribe
Beritan tribe
Bilice tribe
Botikan tribe
Canbegan tribe
Cibran tribe
Çolemêrgan tribe
Cunan tribe
Çanmerik tribe 
Çarekan tribe
Çikan tribe
Emeran tribe
Giransor tribe
Gokdere tribe
Hasenan tribe
Izol tribe
Karsan tribe
Karabaş tribe
Kimsor tribe
Kubat tribe
Kurêşan tribe
Lertik tribe
Lolan tribe
Maksudan tribe
Maskan tribe
Musyan tribe
Okçiyan tribe
Omeran tribe 
Pox tribe
Remman tribe
Şadiyan tribe
Seter tribe
Solaxan tribe
Şêxleran tribe
Tavus tribe
Xilan tribe
Xormekan tribe
Zikte tribe
Zimtek tribe

Bitlis Province
The following tribes are present in Bitlis Province:
Alikan tribe
Balekan tribe
Bekiran tribe
Dimilî tribe
Dûdêran tribe
Etmanekî tribe
Geydan tribe
Keşkoliyan tribe
Mamediyan tribe
Mamxuran tribe
Motikan tribe
Silokan tribe

Black Sea and Marmara Regions
The following tribes are present in the Black Sea Region and Marmara Region:
Canbegan tribe (in Amasya Province, Çorum Province and Tokat Province)
Kawan tribe (in Çorum Province)
Reşwan tribe (in Çorum Province)
Şeyhhasan tribe (in Giresun Province)
Şêxbizin tribe (in Amasya Province, Çorum Province, Düzce Province,  Samsun Province, Sinop Province and Tokat Province)

Diyarbakır Province
The following tribes are present in Diyarbakır Province and are all Shafi'i:
Bekirhan tribe
Bedikan tribe
Çaruma tribe
Dodikan tribe
Hancuk tribe
Hasani tribe
Hevedan tribe
Hiyan tribe
Izol tribe
Keşko tribe
Kulp tribe
Mendan tribe
Narik tribe
Omeran tribe
Paşur tribe
Peçari tribe
Şeyhdoda tribe
Zahori tribe

Elazığ Province
The following tribes are present in Elazığ Province and are all Hanafi unless noted:
Balyan tribe
Beritan tribe (Hanafi and Shafi'i)
Bulanik tribe
Direjan tribe
Genmutlu tribe
Gökdere tribe
Izol tribe
Herdi tribe
Karabegyan tribe
Karaçor tribe
Kasiman tribe
Milan tribe
Okçiyan tribe
Oşin tribe
Parçikan tribe
Sivan tribe
Şadiyan tribe
Şavak tribe
Sinemilli tribe (Alevi)
Zeyve tribe 
Zimtek tribe 
Zirkan tribe

Erzincan Province
The following tribes are present in Erzincan Province:
Abasan tribe
Alan tribe
Arel tribe
Aşuran tribe
Atman tribe
Balaban tribe
Balan tribe
Bamasoran tribe
Botikan tribe
Çarekan tribe
Derviş Cemal tribe
Karikan tribe
Keçelan tribe
Keman tribe
Koçgiri tribe
Kurêşan tribe
Kurmeş tribe
Lolan tribe
Menikan tribe
Rutan tribe
Sinemili tribe
Sisan tribe
Şadiyan tribe
Şêx Mehmedan tribe
Xormekan tribe
Zilan tribe

Erzurum Province
The following tribes are present in Erzurum Province:
Balaban tribe
Belican tribe
Belikan tribe
Cibran tribe
Çarekan tribe
Dilxêran tribe
Dimilî tribe
Hasenan tribe
Kubat tribe
Sevkar tribe
Şadiyan tribe
Şexbizin tribe
Xormekan tribe
Zerikan tribe

Gaziantep Province
The following tribes are present in Gaziantep Province and are all Hanafi unless noted:
Atman tribe (Alevi)
Celikan tribe
Delikan tribe 
Reşwan tribe

Greater Kars Provinces
The following tribes are present in Kars Province and Iğdır Province (one province until 1993) and are all Shafi'i unless noted:
Adaman tribe
Azizan tribe (Hanafi)
Badikan tribe (Hanafi)
Badiiyan tribe (Hanafi)
Banoki tribe
Beboyi tribe
Bekiran tribe
Belhikan tribe
Bezkan tribe (Hanafi)
Birmiyan tribe (Hanafi)
Burukan tribe (Hanafi and Shafi'i)
Cemaldin tribe (Hanafi and Shafi'i)
Cibran tribe (Hanafi)
Cinihan tribe (Alevi)
Cunikan tribe (Hanafi)
Dilhayran tribe (Hanafi and Shafi'i)
Elya tribe
Gaskan tribe (Hanafi and Shafi'i)
Gavasyan tribe
Goran tribe (Hanafi)
Haciyani tribe
Halikan tribe
Hiloğlu tribe
Jalali tribe (Hanafi)
Kalkan tribe
Kaskil tribe
Keskoyi tribe
Koskan tribe (Hanafi)
Kurtkan tribe
Lolan tribe (Alevi)
Malbat tribe
Milyan tribe (Hanafi)
Mirdesan tribe (Hanafi)
Pirebat tribe (Hanafi and Shafi'i)
Retkan tribe (Hanafi and Shafi'i)
Sakan tribe
Seydoyan tribe (Hanafi)
Sipkan tribe
Suleyman tribe
Şemsikan tribe
Telfesan tribe (Hanafi)

Gümüşhane Province
The following tribes are present in Gümüşhane Province and are all Alevi:
Abasan tribe
Abdalan tribe
Arel tribe
Butkan tribe
Kurêşan tribe
Lolan tribe
Şadiyan tribe
Şeyhhasan tribe
Xormekan tribe

Hakkâri Province
The following tribes are present in Hakkâri Province:
Begzade tribe
Diri tribe
Doski tribe
Ertuşi tribe
Gerdî tribe
Gewdan tribe
Giravî tribe
Goyan tribe
Herkî tribe
Humara tribe
Jirkî tribe
Mamxûran tribe
Oramar tribe
Pinyanişî tribe
Qeşûran tribe
Silehi tribe
Zerzan tribe

Kahramanmaraş Province
The following tribes are present in Kahramanmaraş Province:
Alxas tribe
Atman tribe
Bugan tribe
Canbegan tribe
Celikan tribe
Cimikan tribe
Harunan tribe
Kasiman tribe
Kiliçli tribe
Koçgiri tribe
Kurecik tribe
Kurne tribe
Pilvankan tribe
Sinemilli tribe
Şadiyan tribe
Şemsikan tribe
Xidiran tribe

Kayseri Province
The following tribes are present in Kayseri Province:
Alxas tribe
Bekiran tribe
Canbeg tribe
Giniyan tribe
Harunan tribe
Karabal tribe
Koçgiri tribe
Kumreş tribe
Sinemilli tribe
Şemsikan tribe

Kilis Province
The following tribes are present in Kilis Province and are all Hanafi:
Delikan tribe

Kırşehir Province
The following tribes are present in Kırşehir Province:
Bêrketî tribe
Molikan tribe
Oxçiyan tribe
Pisiyan tribe
Reşwan tribe
Şêxbilan tribe
Şexbizin tribe

Konya Province
The following tribes are present in Konya Province:
Canbegan tribe
Celikan tribe
Cudikan tribe
Molikan tribe
Omeran tribe
Reşwan tribe
Sewêdi tribe
Sêfkan tribe
Şexbizin tribe
Têrikan tribe
Xelikan tribe

Malatya Province
The following tribes are present in Malatya Province:
Aluç tribe
Atman tribe
Balyan tribe
Canbeg tribe
Direjan tribe
Herdi tribe
Izol tribe
Kurecik tribe
Molikan tribe
Parçikan tribe
Reşwan tribe
Sinemilli tribe
Sînanka tribe
Zeyve tribe

Mardin Province
The following tribes are present in Mardin Province:
Abasan tribe
Alikan tribe
Aluwa tribe
Arbanî tribe
Arnas tribe
Basiqil tribe
Barava/Derhawî tribe
Botikan tribe
Bubilan tribe
Celali tribe
Çomeran tribe
Dasikan tribe
Dakoran tribe
Dekşori tribe
Dera tribe
Dêreverî tribe
Dermemikan tribe
Domanan tribe
Dorikan tribe
Dimilî tribe
Erebiyan tribe
Gergerî tribe
Habezbenî tribe
Harunan tribe
Hasenan tribe
Hemika tribe
Heramî tribe
Hevêrkan tribe
Kasikan tribe
Kîkan tribe
Koçekan tribe
Lêf tribe
Mamûdan tribe
Meman tribe
Meşkinan tribe
Metinan tribe
Milan tribe
Omerkan tribe
Qelenderan tribe
Raman tribe
Rutan tribe
Salihan tribe
Sefan tribe
Selikan tribe
Sinikan tribe
Sorkan tribe
Surgucu tribe
Şeb tribe
Şemikan tribe
Şêxan tribe
Temikan tribe
Tepêbarava tribe
Xalecan tribe
Xurs tribe
Zaxuran tribe

Muş Province
The following tribes are present in Muş Province and are all Shafi'i unless noted:
Abdalan tribe [Alevi]
Badikan tribe
Bekiran tribe
Bonaki tribe
Bozikan tribe
Cibran tribe
Çeçen tribe (see Chechen Kurds, Hanafi and Shafi'i)
Çerek tribe (Hanafi and Shafi'i)
Çukur tribe
Elmali tribe
Halefbey tribe
Hasenan tribe
Haydaran tribe
Heridi tribe
Hiyan tribe
Hizan tribe
Huyut tribe
Jalali tribe
Lezgi tribe (Hanafi and Shafi'i)
Lolan tribe (Alevi)
Parsink tribe
Rektan tribe
Savdan tribe
Top tribe
Zamanağa tribe

Siirt Province
The following tribes are present in Siirt Province and are all Shafi'i:
Adiyan tribe
Alikan tribe
Bekiran tribe
Dûdêran tribe
Erebiyan tribe
Garisan tribe
Keşkoliyan tribe
Mamediyan tribe
Pencenarî tribe
Silokan tribe
Soran tribe
Şakiran tribe
Sturkiyan tribe

Sivas Province
The following tribes are present in Sivas Province:
Alxas tribe
Atman tribe
Bulucan tribe
Canbegan tribe
Celikan tribe
Çarekan tribe
Çuxraş tribe
Direjan tribe
Giniyan tribe
Koçgiri tribe
Kurecik tribe
Kurmeş tribe
Kurne tribe
Sinemilli tribe
Şadiyan tribe
Şemsikan tribe
Xormekan tribe

Şanlıurfa Province
The following tribes are present in Şanlıurfa Province:
Acem tribe
Badilli tribe
Bezikan tribe
Bucak tribe
Canbegan tribe
Delikan tribe
Dodikan tribe
Hartavi tribe
Izol tribe
Karahan tribe
Karakeçili tribe
Kawan tribe
Kejan tribe
Ketikan tribe
Kirvar tribe
Mersavi tribe
Milan tribe
Mirdesan tribe
Modan tribe
Pijan tribe
Reşwan tribe
Sinikan tribe
Suleyman tribe
Şabikan tribe
Şeddadî tribe
Şêxan tribe
Terikan tribe

Şırnak Province
The following tribes are present in Şırnak Province:
Alikan
Aluwa
Amara
Bajarî
Batûyan/Botikan
Dêrşewî
Domanan
Dorikan
Dûdêran
Garîstan
Gewdan
Giravî
Girkê Emo
Giteyî
Goyan
Harûnan
Hecî Eliya
Hêsinan
Jirkî
Jîlyan
Kîçan
Mamxûran
Meman
Mîran
Mûsareşan
Omerkan
Qeşûran
Salihan
Sindî
Sipêrti
Soran
Şikakî
Şirnexî
Tayan
Welatî
Xêrikan
Zedkan
Zeherî
Zêvkî

Tunceli Province
The following tribes are present in Tunceli Province:
Abasan tribe
Alan tribe
Arel tribe
Aslanan tribe
Aşuran tribe
Bahtiyaran tribe
Balaban tribe
Balan tribe
Beyitan tribe
Birman tribe
Çarekan tribe
Demenan tribe
Ferhadan tribe
Haydaran tribe
Hiran tribe
Izol tribe
Kalan tribe
Keman tribe
Karabal tribe
Karsan tribe
Keçelan tribe
Kirgan tribe
Kurêşan tribe
Laçin tribe
Lolan tribe
Maksudan tribe
Pilvankan tribe
Qoçan tribe
Rutan tribe
Sisan tribe
Sûran tribe
Şadiyan tribe
Şavak tribe
Şavalan tribe
Şêx Mehmedan tribe
Xormekan tribe
Yusufan tribe

Van Province
The following tribes are present in Van Province and are all Shafi'i:
Adaman tribe
Alan tribe
Asiyan tribe
Buriki tribe
Botan tribe
Ertuşi tribe
Ezdinan tribe
Geloi tribe
Hacidiran tribe
Haydaran tribe
Kurêşan tribe
Manhuran tribe
Meleyan tribe
Memani tribe
Milan tribe
Pinyaniş tribe 
Shekak tribe
Şemsikan tribe
Takuri tribe

Historical tribes
Bejnewi tribe (see Emirate of Hasankeyf)
Beşneviye tribe (see Principality of Eğil)
Hadhabani tribe 
Humeydiye tribe (see Principality of Eğil)
Mahmudi tribe
Qaymarriya tribe
Shabankara tribe
Shirwi tribe (see Emirate of Hasankeyf)

Notes

Bibliography

 
Lists of modern Indo-European tribes and clans